Schenkeldijk can refer to:

 Schenkeldijk, Binnenmaas
 Schenkeldijk, Korendijk